Discospermum reyesii is a species of genus Discospermum, which are flowering plants in the family Rubiaceae. The species was described in 2018, and was found on Mt. Lantoy, Cebu, Philippines. This species closely resemble that of D. whitfordii because of slightly similar leaf blades, leaf apices, and non-ribbed fruits. However, the species differs from D. whitfordii due to its smaller fruits with size of 1 - 1.2 cm, smaller seed size to 1 - 1.4 mm x 1.5 - 2.5 mm dimensions, 4 - 6 seeds per locule, whereas D. whitfordii have 2 - 2.7 cm fruit size, 5 - 6.5 mm x 5 - 6.5(7) mm seed size, and 5 - 12 seeds per locule.

Etymology
The species was named after the Far Eastern University's first President and founding chairman Dr. Nicanor Reyes Sr.

References

External links 
 Discospermum in the World Checklist of Rubiaceae
 Discospermum in the Plant List

Rubiaceae genera
Coffeeae
Flora of Asia
Endemic flora of the Philippines